Horace Arthur "Tony" Ableton (15 April 1895 – 1978) was a comedic performer in Jamaica and World War I veteran of the British West Indies Regiment (B.W.I.R.) He partnered  with Ernest Cupidon in the duo "Cupes and Abes" during the 1920s and 1930s. Ableton was born in Spanish Town, Jamaica and attended Beckford and Smith. He  joined the B.W.I.R during World War I and served in the 2nd Battalion. He was deployed to England, France, Egypt and Palestine and became an M.B.E. in the Queen's Birthday Honours in 1963.

References

Jamaican comedians
1895 births
1978 deaths
People from Spanish Town
Members of the Order of the British Empire
20th-century comedians